Everything's OK is the 28th studio album by American R&B singer Al Green (credited on the cover art and track credits of this album as "The Reverend Al Green"), produced by Willie Mitchell and Green, and released in 2005 on the Blue Note label.  The album peaked at #19 on the R&B chart and #50 on the pop chart, Green's first album to place in the pop top 50 since 1975.

Reception 

Everything's OK was very positively received by critics, and has a favorable Metacritic rating of 76/100 based on 11 reviews.  Critics noted that in comparison with the previous I Can't Stop, Everything's OK contained fewer conscious nods towards Green's 1970s Hi Records heyday and had a more contemporary overall sound.  In a very enthusiastic review in Rolling Stone, David Wild wrote "I Can't Stop was impressive, but something was missing. Everything's OK is something else entirely.  This time...the tunes (are) top-notch.  Everything's OK is...one more righteous, red-hot reason to treasure this surviving genius of soul", while Allmusic's Tim Sendra said "Consider I Can't Stop the rehab assignment in Triple A, while Everything's OK is the home run Green fans have been dreaming about.  Writing in The Guardian, Betty Clarke stated "This is classic Green. To Mitchell's lush 1970s sound, with its bluesy horns and sexy strings, Green adds his ageless falsetto and rumbling sensuality."  PopMatters' David Marchese noted "The groovier songs will put a glide in your stride and a dip in your hip, but it's the ballads that'll make you hit the repeat button. This is an album of old pros doing what they do best, and the ballads give them the best setting to do it in."

Track listing 
 "Everything's OK" (Al Green, Willie Mitchell) - 4:12
 "You Are So Beautiful" (Bruce Fisher, Billy Preston) - 3:34
 "Build Me Up" (Green, Mitchell) - 3:50
 "Perfect to Me" (Green, Mitchell) - 4:09
 "Nobody But You" (Green, Mitchell) - 3:30
 "Real Love" (Green) - 5:22
 "I Can Make Music" (Green, Steve Potts, Leroy Hodges, Lester Snell, Charles "Skip" Pitts, Bobby Manuel, Robert Clayborne) - 4:40
 "Be My Baby" (Green) - 3:16
 "Magic Road" (Green) - 3:43
 "I Wanna Hold You" (Green) - 3:40
 "Another Day" (Green) - 3:19
 "All the Time" (Green, Manuel) - 4:01

Personnel 

 Al Green – lead vocals, backing vocals 
 Lester Snell – acoustic piano
 Robert Clayborne – organ
 Bobby Manuel – guitars
 Charles "Skip" Pitts – guitars
 Leroy Hodges – bass
 Steve Potts – drums, percussion
 Hector Diaz – congas, percussion
 Bobby Rush – harmonica
 Jim Spake – baritone saxophone 
 Andrew Love – tenor saxophone 
 Lannie McMillan – tenor saxophone 
 Bill Florez – bass trombone
 Jack Hale – trombone
 Scott Thompson – trumpet
 Jonathan Kirkscey and Peter Spurbeck – cello 
 Anthony Gilbert and Beth Luscombe – viola
 Joan Gilbert, Daniel Gilbert, Gregory Morris and Liza Zurlinden – violin
 Charlie Chalmers – backing vocals 
 Donna Rhodes – backing vocals 
 Sandra Rhodes – backing vocals

Charts

References 

Al Green albums
Blue Note Records albums
Albums produced by Willie Mitchell (musician)
2005 albums